"Ghost of a Chance" is a song by the Canadian rock band Rush released as the third single from their 1991 album Roll the Bones. The single peaked at No. 2 on the U.S. Album Rocks Track chart. The lyrics focus on finding love, and as its strength over any other force.

Although the song was a radio hit at the time of its release, it has rarely been performed live. It was most recently featured on the 2008 leg of the Snakes & Arrows Tour.

Track listing 
Music by Geddy Lee and Alex Lifeson; lyrics by Neil Peart.
 
US release:
Ghost of a Chance (Edit) – 4:25
Ghost of a Chance (Album Version) – 5:19
 
UK / German release:
Ghost of a Chance – 5:19
Dreamline – 4:38
Chain Lightning – 4:33 [only on CD]
Red Tide – 4:29 [only on CD]

Personnel
Geddy Lee – vocals, bass
Alex Lifeson – guitar
Neil Peart – drums

References

Rush (band) songs
1991 songs
1992 singles
Songs written by Neil Peart
Songs written by Geddy Lee
Songs written by Alex Lifeson
Song recordings produced by Rupert Hine
Atlantic Records singles